The 2023 Stony Brook Seawolves football team will represent the Stony Brook University as a member of the Colonial Athletic Association (CAA) during the 2023 NCAA Division I FCS football season. The Seawolves are led by 18th-year head coach Chuck Priore and play home games at Kenneth P. LaValle Stadium in Stony Brook, New York.

Previous season

The Seawolves finished the 2022 season with an overall record of 2–9, 1–7 CAA play to finish in a tie for last place.

Schedule

References

Stony Brook
Stony Brook Seawolves football seasons
Stony Brook Seawolves football